North Township is one of 11 townships in Lake County, Indiana. As of the 2010 census, its population was 162,855 and it contained 67,828 housing units.

Geography

Municipalities
The six municipalities of North Township, which lie totally within its boundaries and their populations as of the 2010 Census, are:

Cities
East Chicago – 29,698
Hammond – 80,830
Whiting – 4,997

Towns
Highland – 23,727
Munster – 23,603
Griffith 
16,000

Education
There are five public school districts in North Township:
School City of East Chicago
School City of Hammond
School City of Whiting
School Town of Highland
School Town of Munster

The privately owned and operated Bishop Noll Institute is located in Hammond.

References

External links
 Indiana Township Association
 United Township Association of Indiana
 Official website

Townships in Lake County, Indiana
Townships in Indiana